The Haunted Hathaways is an American sitcom that premiered on Nickelodeon on July 13, 2013. The first season was originally planned to have 20 episodes but was picked up to 26 episodes on August 21, 2013. Season 2 is the final season as no new episodes were confirmed at the 2015/16 upfront.

, The Haunted Hathaways has aired 47 episodes over two seasons.

Series overview

Episodes

Season 1 (2013–14)

Season 2 (2014–15)

References

External links
 

Lists of American sitcom episodes
Lists of Nickelodeon television series episodes